Odirah Franklin Ntephe (born 26 September 1993) is a Nigerian footballer who plays as a right midfielder for Burreli in Kategoria e Parë.

References

1993 births
Living people
Nigerian footballers
Kategoria e Parë players
Kategoria Superiore players
Nigerian expatriate footballers
Nigerian expatriate sportspeople in Albania
Expatriate footballers in Albania
KF Bylis Ballsh players
KS Burreli players
Association football midfielders